Datuk Seri Panglima Stephen Robert Evans (died 2017) SPDK, JP is a politician, public administrator and author from Sabah, Malaysia.

Evans was born in Kampong Bariawa Laut, a small village in Keningau District, North Borneo (now Sabah). His father was Richard F. Evans, District Officer and later Resident of the West Coast for the North Borneo Chartered Company Government, which ruled North Borneo until the 1942 Japanese invasion in World War II.

Education 
Evans studied in a Japanese primary school in Keningau during the occupation. After the war he was schooled at Catholic mission schools at Sandakan, at Jesselton (now Kota Kinabalu) and at Kuching, Sarawak. He attended universities in Britain, United States and Australia, gaining B.Sc. and MA degrees in Public Administration and Diplomas in Journalism and Agriculture. In 1966, he was awarded a Columbo Plan Scholarship from the New Zealand Government to study Public Administration and Local Government.

Political career 
Evans had a distinguished career as a politician in Sabah. He served as a Member of Parliament from 8 August 1974 to 1 June 1977, and a Senator from 15 December 1977 to 20 June 1978. He was re-elected as an MP from 15 July 1978 until 29 March 1982. In 1986, he was elected as a member of the Legislative Assembly, serving from 5 May 1986 until 26 June 1990. Evans was awarded a PGDK, Commander of the Order of Kinabalu (second class Datukship: Datuk) by the State Government in 1977 and in 1989 he was conferred the State's highest award, SPDK, Grand Commander of the Order of Kinabalu (first class Datukship: Datuk Seri Panglima).

Evans also served as a Justice of the Peace, and was a life member of the Commonwealth Parliamentary Association and the Malaysian Parliamentary Association. He authored several books, and twice won the Borneo Literature Bureau's Literature Competition. He was fluent in English, Malay, Kadazan/Dusun and Murut.

Death 
Evans died on 27 September 2017 at the age of 82. Musa Aman, Sabah's chief minister, called on the family residence to pay his last respects.

Bibliography 
 Guide for Sabah Native Courts (1967) Kuching: Borneo Literature Bureau
 Further Folktales from Sabah (1977) Kuching: Borneo Literature Bureau
 English for students preparing for the Malaysia Certificate of Education the Cambridge School Certificate and General Certificate of Education Examinations (1988) Keningau, Sabah: Stephen R. Evans
 Sabah (North Borneo) Under the Rising Sun Government (1990, reprinted 1999) Singapore: Stephen R. Evans ('The Author's Profile' in this book has provided much of the material for this article; large parts of Evans' book are copied word-for-word from Kinabalu Guerillas by Maxwell Hall (1949))
 The History of Labuan Island (Victoria Island) (1996) Stephen R. Evans, Abdul Rahman Zainal and Rod Wong Khet Ngee. Singapore: Calendar Print

References 

Kadazan-Dusun people
2017 deaths
People from Sabah
Year of birth missing
Justices of the peace
Malaysian people of British descent
Malaysian people of English descent
Multilingual writers
Members of the Dewan Negara
Members of the Dewan Rakyat
Members of the Sabah State Legislative Assembly

Grand Commanders of the Order of Kinabalu
Commanders of the Order of Kinabalu